Choi Yoo-jung may refer to:

 Choi Yoo-jung (actress) (born 1976), South Korean actress
 Choi Yoo-jung (singer) (born 1999), South Korean singer
 Choi Yu-jung (ice hockey) (born 2000), South Korean ice hockey player